Belarusian protests may refer to:
 
 Jeans Revolution (2006)
 2010 Ploshcha
 2011 Belarusian protests
 Teddybear Airdrop Minsk 2012
 2017 Belarusian protests
 2020–2021 Belarusian protests